Ande may refer to:
Andes
Atmospheric Neutral Density Experiment
ANDE (Paraguay), national electric company of Paraguay
Michael Ande (born 1944), German actor
Ande Township (安德镇) in Pidu District, Chengdu, China

See also
 Andé, a commune in the Eure department and Haute-Normandie region of France